The 14th Asianet Film Awards  honors the best films in 2011 and was held on 6 January 2012 at Dubai. The title sponsor of the event was Ujala.

Awards winners
Source:

Special awards

References

2012 film awards
Asianet Film Awards
2012 Indian film awards